"Heart Attack" is a song recorded by American singer Demi Lovato. The song was released on February 25, 2013, as the lead single from her fourth studio album Demi (2013). The song was produced by Mitch Allan, and Jason Evigan of "The Suspex", who co-wrote the song along with Lovato, Sean Douglas, Nikki Williams, and Aaron Phillips. "Heart Attack" is an electropop song that employs cardiac motifs to represent the fear of falling in love. It received acclaim from music critics, many of whom complimented its lyrics and Lovato's vocals.

The song sold 215,000 copies in the US in its first week, her best sales week for a song download, and peaked at number ten on the US Billboard Hot 100, becoming Lovato's second solo top-ten single on the chart. It was later certified quadruple platinum by the Recording Industry Association of America (RIAA), having sold over two million copies in the United States. "Heart Attack" also performed well internationally, attaining certifications in multiple countries, including Australia, Canada, Denmark, Mexico, Sweden and the United Kingdom.

An accompanying music video for "Heart Attack" was directed by Chris Applebaum and was premiered through Vevo on April 9, 2013. Lovato has performed the track on several television programs and has also included the song on the setlists of her headlining The Neon Lights Tour (2014), The Demi World Tour (2014-2015), her coheadlining The Future Now Tour (2016), and her headlining The Tell Me You Love Me Tour (2018).

Background and release

"Heart Attack" was produced by Mitch Allan and Jason Evigan of "The Suspex", who co-wrote the song along with Lovato, Sean Douglas, Nikki Williams, and Aaron Phillips. Nikki Williams said the song was written two years prior to its release. She explained: "At the time I was going through some relationship stuff, and I was just so depressed, so when I got into the session I thought, 'You know what? I'm gonna pour it all out there, and get it off my chest'". The song was first intended for Williams, but her record label rejected it. Pia Toscano then recorded the song in 2011 intending it for her debut album with Interscope, but it did not materialize. When Lovato heard the song, she recorded it before altering a few lyrics. In an interview with MTV, Evigan explained:

According to him, the first version also contained a dubstep breakdown, which was removed for Lovato. He also stated, "Demi has magic to it where she has so much sass in her voice but yet so much power and all those really high notes at the end, she added that on the spot." Williams described the song, said: "It's about me being really scared to fall in love again after being rejected, after feeling so fragile and vulnerable all the time — thinking, I don't know if I can do this ever again!" Lovato told MTV that the song's lyrics address "falling in love and taking that risk. But, she's terrified and, by 'she,' I mean me. But, I think everyone comes to a point where they feel very vulnerable in falling in love and that's what I'm talking about."

A trailer of "Heart Attack" was released on February 12, 2013. The song was originally set to premiere on On Air with Ryan Seacrest, but leaked online on February 24, 2013, springing Hollywood Records' marketing department into early action. "I was having an Oscar party at my house when [the leak] went down, so I had to excuse myself and have a conference call," said Hollywood Records' head of global marketing Robbie Snow. One day after its leak online, Hollywood Records quickly released the song on iTunes Store, Spotify and other streaming services on February 25, 2013. She also released an official Vevo clip of the song the same day, and asked Seacrest to link his Twitter followers to the track. Additionally, a lyric video debuted on March 1, 2013. Lovato prompted fans to unlock the video by tweeting song lyrics and the hashtag #UnlockHeartAttack, which became a worldwide trending topic on Twitter.

Composition
"Heart Attack" is an electropop song, with a length of three minutes and thirty seconds. The song is composed in the key of F minor and features a moderate tempo of 87 beats per minute. Lovato's vocal range spans from the low note of F3 to the high note of E6, in whistle register. In the first verses, Lovato sings among a "booming" beat: "Never put my love out on the line/ Never said 'yes' to the right guy... When I don't care/ I can play 'em like a Ken doll/ Won't wash my hair/ Then make 'em bounce like a basketball." The song features a power pop chorus where Lovato sings accompanied by a guitar.

Critical reception
"Heart Attack" received acclaim from music critics. Sam Lansky of Idolator described the song as "a monster electropop track with some impressive Kelly Clarkson-esque wailing, a little drum-and-bass-inspired instrumentation on the chorus and a catchy guitar loop." Ray Rahman of Entertainment Weekly wrote: "the song is a big one, with pounding beats, earnest wailing, and some interesting lyrical choices." Maggie Malach of AOL Music gave a positive review, stating "Demi's last album had a strong R&B influence, but this song indicates she is going for a dancier vibe!" Billboard wrote that Lovato's sequel to "Give Your Heart a Break" continues in the vein of her cardiologically-themed singles and "demonstrates her maturing vocal range." Robert Copsey from Digital Spy deemed the song a "rare case of textbook pop that leaves a lasting impression" and gave it four stars out of five. Adam R. Holtz of Plugged In complimented the lyrical content of the song and its "infectious lilt of Lovato's proven pop vocal chops slathered over an up-to-the-minute EDM sonic foundation." Reviewing the album Demi, Amy Sciarretto from Artist direct wrote: "Heart Attack" is easily one of Lovato's best overall, mixing synthy tension and her better-than-most voice, at least when it comes to the teen pop genre. She is a decidedly more capable vocalist than so many of her peers, and she doesn't require the heavy effects, the processing or the studio tricks that they do."

Commercial performance
"Heart Attack" made its chart debut on the Mainstream Top 40 chart at number 35. Billboard predicted the song would debut on the Billboard Hot 100 the following week on March 4, 2013, with an expected sales figure of 200,000 in first-week digital downloads, surpassing Lovato's "Skyscraper" (2011). Having sold 215,000 digital copies in the first week, "Heart Attack" debuted at number 12 on the Hot 100 on the week ending on March 8, 2013, and at the time was the second highest debut sales week of any artist for 2013. Along with the lead single's Hot 100 position, it debuted at number four on the Digital Songs chart, number 70 on the Radio Songs chart, and just under the top twenty on the newly implemented Streaming Songs chart. On April 27, 2013, "Heart Attack" became Lovato's third top ten hit in the United States, reaching number 10.
In April 2013, "Heart Attack" was certified gold by the RIAA with sales brimming 500,000 in the space of only four weeks and as of 2014 has sold over 2,000,000 copies in the United States.
In the United Kingdom and Ireland, "Heart Attack" debuted at number three, becoming Lovato's highest-charting single at the time in both countries, until "Solo", which reached number one on both charts in 2018. It received a platinum certification in the UK for sales exceeding 600,000 units.

Music videos
The lyric video was released on March 1, 2013. On the video, a series of hashtags were used by her fans on Twitter, with the lyrics of the song. Trevor Kelly, executive director of global digital marketing Disney Music Group, said: "We knew that we wanted to involve Demi's fans in the lyric video, both in terms of how it was discovered and how it looked creatively... That was challenging to execute because the volume of trends she had created over the past year, but we ended up with a clip that was very unique and compelling to watch".

Regarding the video, Lovato described it as "fashion based" and thought it was "incredible to incorporate that with the music video". A teaser of the video was released on April 6, 2013. The music video was filmed on March 14, 2013, in Los Angeles, California and released on Vevo on April 9, 2013, and garnered over 700 million views to date. It was directed by Chris Applebaum.

Live performances
Lovato first performed the song in Orlando, Florida on March 2, 2013,
as well as on several live shows including The Ellen DeGeneres Show, Good Morning America, Jimmy Kimmel Live!, Britain's Got Talent, Dancing with the Stars and at the 2013 MuchMusic Video Awards.

On December 31, 2013, Lovato performed it at ET Canada's New Year's Eve televised show. Lovato performed the song along with "Give Your Heart a Break" and "Neon Lights" at the 2nd Indonesian Choice Awards, on May 24, 2015. She also performed the song on The Late Late Show with James Corden, during the Carpool Karaoke segment, which appeared online on May 16, 2016.

Lovato performed the track during her third, fourth, fifth, and sixth headlining concert tours, The Neon Lights Tour, the Demi World Tour, the Future Now Tour, and the Tell Me You Love Me World Tour.

Awards and nominations

Credits and personnel
Recording and management
Mixed at MixStar Studios (Virginia Beach)
Mastered at Sterling Sound Studios (New York City)
Published by BMG Platinum Songs/Art In The Fodder Music/Part of the Problem Publishing (BMI), BMG Platinum Songs/Bad Robot Music (BMI), Philmore Music (ASCAP), Seven Peaks Music (ASCAP) and Demi Lovato Publishing (ASCAP)

Personnel
Demi Lovato – vocals, songwriting
Mitch Allan – songwriting, production
Jason Evigan – songwriting, production
Sean Douglas – songwriting
Nikki Williams – songwriting
Aaron Phillips – songwriting
Serban Ghenea – mixing
John Hanes – engineering
Chris Gehringer – mastering

Credits adapted from the liner notes of Demi.

Charts

Weekly charts

Year-end charts

Certifications

Release history

See also
 List of Billboard Hot 100 top 10 singles in 2013
 List of number-one dance singles of 2013 (U.S.)
 List of UK top 10 singles in 2013

References

2013 singles
2013 songs
Demi Lovato songs
Electropop songs
Hollywood Records singles
Music videos directed by Chris Applebaum
Songs written by Demi Lovato
Songs written by Jason Evigan
Songs written by Mitch Allan
Songs written by Nikki Williams
Songs written by Sean Douglas (songwriter)
Power pop songs